Çiğdem Özyaman (born 1985 in Düzce, Turkey) is a Turkish sport shooter competing in the skeet event.

She began sport shooting at the age of 14 with her father's encouragement. She serves as a teacher of physical education in a primary school at Bolu after her graduation from Selçuk University.

Çiğdem Özyaman qualified to participate in the skeet event at the 2012 Summer Olympics with her gold medal achieved at the 2011 European Shooting Championships held in Belgrade, Serbia. She was one of the first two Turkish female Olympic sport shooters; the other being Nihan Kantarcı, who was selected to compete in the trap event.

Achievements

References

1985 births
People from Düzce
Selçuk University alumni
Turkish female sport shooters
Skeet shooters
ISSF rifle shooters
Living people
Olympic shooters of Turkey
Shooters at the 2012 Summer Olympics